Cattleya longipes, commonly known as the long-column sophronitis, is a species of orchid endemic to southeastern Brazil (Serra do Cipó).

References 

longipes
Endemic orchids of Brazil